7.65mm may refer to the following firearms cartridges:

 .32 ACP (7.65×17mm Browning)
 7.65mm Roth–Sauer
 7.65×20mm Longue
 7.65×21mm Parabellum
 7.65×21mm Mannlicher
 7.65×25mm Borchardt
 7.65×53mm Mauser